Lukáš Pech (born September 19, 1983) is a Czech professional ice hockey forward currently playing with Motor České Budějovice of the Czech Extraliga (ELH). He has formerly played with HC Karlovy Vary in the Czech Extraliga during the 2010–11 Czech Extraliga season.

References

External links 
 

1983 births
Czech ice hockey forwards
HC Karlovy Vary players
Living people
Motor České Budějovice players
HC Sparta Praha players
Sportspeople from Jihlava
Sportovní Klub Kadaň players